Boris Yuryevich Nikitin (born 11 August 1967) is a former Russian football player.

External links
 

1967 births
Footballers from Saint Petersburg
Living people
FC Dynamo Saint Petersburg players
Soviet footballers
FC Zenit Saint Petersburg players
FC Fakel Voronezh players
Russian footballers
FC Lokomotiv Moscow players
Russian Premier League players
Association football midfielders
Association football forwards
FC Lokomotiv Saint Petersburg players